Events from the year 1979 in Taiwan, Republic of China. This year is numbered Minguo 68 according to the official Republic of China calendar.

Incumbents
 President – Chiang Ching-kuo
 Vice President – Hsieh Tung-min
 Premier – Sun Yun-suan
 Vice Premier – Hsu Ching-chung

Events

January
 1 January:
The United States withdraws recognition of the Republic of China and recognizes the People's Republic of China as the sole legitimate government of "China".
People’s Republic of China’s Standing Committee of the National People's Congress published the 
 11 January – The establishments of Export-Import Bank of the Republic of China.

February
 8 February – The opening of Chongde Station and Heping Station of Taiwan Railways Administration in Xiulin Township, Hualien County.
 26 February – Chiang Kai-shek International Airport located in Taoyuan County (now is Taoyuan County) officially opened.

April
 April 4 — United States President Jimmy Carter signs the Taiwan Relations Act into law.
 President Chiang Ching-kuo promulgated the Three Noes policy with dealing with the mainland: “no contact, no negotiation and no compromise”

May
 17 May – The defection of Justin Yifu Lin to the People's Republic of China.

July
 24 July – The establishment of Institute for Information Industry.

September
12 September – The Republic of China repeals a law mandating "closure" of the Taiwan Strait, ending blockade conditions in effect since June 1949.

July
 1 July – Upgrade of Kaohsiung City from provincial city to special municipality.

December
 10 December – Kaohsiung Incident in Kaohsiung.

Births
 18 January – Jay Chou, musician, singer-songwriter, multi-instrumentalist, actor and director
 12 March – Holger Chen, Internet celebrity
 19 March – Lu Wei-chih, golf athlete
 4 April – Joe Chen, actress, singer and model
 20 April – Quinn Weng, singer
 22 April – Yang Chien-fu, baseball player
 2 June – Huang Wen-hsing, singer and actor
 16 July – Landy Wen, singer
 30 July – Show Lo, singer, actor and host
 24 August – Elva Hsiao, singer
 15 November – Joyce Chao, actress and singer
 5 December – Megan Lai, actress and singer
 31 December – Hsieh Ying-hsuan, actress

Deaths
 5 April – Wang Yun-wu, Vice Premier (1958–1963)

References

 
Years of the 20th century in Taiwan